Mississippi Highway 346 (MS 346), also known as Hurricane Road, is a  west–east state highway in Pontotoc County, Mississippi, connecting the community of Esperanza with MS 15 and the town of Ecru. It is generally a narrow two-lane route.

Route description
MS 346 begins at the beginning of state maintenance just before Sand Springs Church, with the road continuing west as Hurricane Road to MS 336. It heads east past the church, and through farmland, to pass through the community of Esperanza, where it has an intersection with MS 355. The highway continues east to cross Cane Creek before paralleling the southern banks of the Little Tallahatchie River as it travels through farmland for the next several miles. MS 346 enters the town of Ecru city limits, immediately passing by the Ashley Furniture plant before coming to an end at an intersection with MS 15, just across the river from downtown.

The entire length of Mississippi Highway 346 is a rural, two-lane, state highway, located entirely in Pontotoc County.

Major intersections

References 

346
Transportation in Pontotoc County, Mississippi